The Boston Journal of Natural History (1834-1863) was a scholarly journal published by the Boston Society of Natural History in mid-19th century  Massachusetts. Contributors included Charles T. Jackson, Augustus A. Gould, and others. Each volume featured lithographic illustrations, some in color, drawn/engraved by E.W. Bouvé, B.F. Nutting, A. Sonrel, et al. and printed by Pendleton's Lithography and other firms.

The journal was continued by Memoirs Read Before the Boston Society of Natural History in 1863.

Further reading
 Boston Journal of Natural History v.1 (1834-1837); v.2 (1838-1839); v.4 (1843-1844); v.5 (1845-1847); v.6 (1850-1857); v.7 (1859-1863).

Image gallery

References

Defunct journals of the United States
Publications established in 1834
Natural history journals
Publications disestablished in 1863
19th century in Boston